German euro coins have three separate designs for the three series of coins. Featured in all designs are the 12 stars of the EU and the year of minting.

In addition to the year, the German coins also feature a small letter as a mint mark indicating the particular mint that minted the coin.

 A: Berlin
 D: Munich
 F: Stuttgart
 G: Karlsruhe
 J: Hamburg

The letters were assigned to the mints as they opened. The mints in Hannover/Vienna (B), Frankfurt am Main (C), and Darmstadt (H) were closed by 1882. After the German separation, D, F, G and J minted coins for the Federal Republic of Germany, while the German Democratic Republic used Berlin (A) and Dresden/Muldenhütte (E) until it closed 1953. Berlin (A) started minting D Mark coins in 1990.

German euro design
For images of the common side and a detailed description of the coins, see euro coins.

Circulating Mintage quantities
The following table shows the mintage quantity for all German euro coins, per denomination, per year (the numbers are represented in millions).

€2 commemorative coins

German Bundesländer series I
Germany started the commemorative coin series  (The 16 States of the Federal Republic of Germany) in 2006, to continue until 2021. The year in which the coin for a specific state is issued coincides with that state's Presidency of the Bundesrat. In 2018, Daniel Günther, the Minister President of Schleswig-Holstein, became the President of the Bundesrat for a one-year term. As a Schleswig-Holstein coin had already been minted in 2006, it was decided to delay the release of the following three states' coins by a year. Instead of honouring a state in 2019, the minted coin commemorates 70 years since the constitution of the German Federal Council or Bundesrat. The last three coins of the series were therefore postponed to 2020, 2021 and 2022, respectively. The coins issued are:

The original designs for these states were changed and were as follows:
 2008 Hamburg: Landungsbrücken
 2010 Free Hanseatic City of Bremen: Bremen City Hall not including Bremen Roland
 2012 Bavaria: Munich Frauenkirche
 2013 Baden-Württemberg Heidelberg Castle
 2014 Lower Saxony: Hanover New City Hall
 2015 Hesse: Römer in Frankfurt am Main
 2018 Berlin: Reichstag

German Bundesländer series II

Others
As of 2020, Germany has issued nine other €2 commemorative coins in addition to those of the "Bundesländer" series:

Collector coins
 Euro gold and silver commemorative coins (Germany)

External links

European Central Bank – Germany

References

Coins of Germany
Euro coins by issuing country
Euro